Pettibone may refer to:

People with the surname
 Alfred Pettibone, businessman and Washington state pioneer
 Augustus Herman Pettibone, American politician
 Charles Pettibone (1841–1925), American newspaper editor
 Claire Pettibone, American fashion designer
 Doug Pettibone, American musician
 George Pettibone, American radical labor activist
 Jay Pettibone, American baseball player
 Jerry Pettibone, American football coach
 John Pettibone, American vocalist
 John Owen Pettibone, American politician
 Jonathan Pettibone, American baseball player
 Marian H. Pettibone, American biologist and curator
 Milton C. Pettibone, mayor of Flint, Michigan (1897–1898)
 Shep Pettibone, record producer and DJ

Places in the United States
 Pettibone, North Dakota
 Pettibone, Texas
 Pettibone Farm, Lanesborough, Massachusetts
 Pettibone Park (La Crosse), Wisconsin

Other uses
 Pettibone (company)

See also
 Senator Pettibone (disambiguation)